The economy of Dresden and the Dresden agglomeration is one of the most dynamic in Germany, and includes high-tech and applied research.

Background

Historical background
Many of the industries that made Dresden rich before the Second World War and disappeared under communism have resettled in the city including the optical industry and the high quality foodstuffs industries. An international famous example is the Dresdner Bank that left in the 1950s to avoid, like many other enterprises, its nationalization. Other branches like the microelectronics and aircraft construction came up in the 1960s. Dresden became a centre in the allocation of the former socialist combines that were centrally planned on the one side and had disposal of regional subunits of nationally-owned enterprises.

Transportation Infrastructure

Dresden is connected in the InterCityExpress and EuroCity train network. Direct lines are running to Berlin, Prague, Frankfurt, Hamburg, Budapest and Vienna. CityNightLine trains are also running to Zürich and Amsterdam among other cities while a EuroNight train serves the Berlin-Dresden-Budapest line.

Dresden has an international airport (Dresden Airport) in the north of the city. The airport is connected by a commuter train line. Scheduled flights are offered to Frankfurt, Munich, Düsseldorf, Vienna and Moscow. Furthermore, there are a lot of touristic flights especially to the Mediterranean Regions.

There is a larger inner harbour in Dresden. The river Elbe waterway connects Dresden with the Hamburg Harbour and Prague. The Midland Canal offers an indirect connection to the Duisport (Duisburg harbour).

Dresden is connected by some longer Bundesautobahns: The A 4 to Frankfurt and Cologne, the A 14 is running to Leipzig and Hannover, the A 13 is running to Berlin and the A 17 is running to Prague.

Facts and figures

The socialist enterprises had been inefficient already before German reunification and were not competitive in the German social market economy. This collapse of economy caused an unemployment rate of about 18 to 19% in the early 1990s. The rate was lowered to 13 to 15% until 2010 but is still relatively high today. In May 2012 the unemployment rate reached a new record low of 8.9%. Nevertheless, Dresden is the city that has developed the most effectively in all of East Germany and has raised its GDP per capita to 31,100 Euro, which is equal to the GDP per capita of some poor West German communities (the average of the 50 biggest cities is around 35,000 Euro). In the discussion of alternatives in the policy of promoting the weak states of the former GDR, Dresden is often cited as an example of successfully subsidising the better-developed centres and regions.

With about 20% of its employees having a university degree and the city being the home of many research institutes, the economy differs from the low-priced subcontracting that is often criticized in East Germany. Nevertheless, Dresden's economy involves extensive public funding. The rate of highly qualified staff is also high because lower-qualified employable people are often unemployed. Due to its dynamism, among other factors, the economy of Dresden is ranked among the best ten cities in Germany to live in.

Enterprises
Three major sectors can be seen as dominating the Dresden economy:

The semiconductor industry was built up in 1969 around the Zentrum Mikroelektronik Dresden, which is a joint stock company named ZMDI today. The labour force's knowledge and education in technology, as well as intensive subsidies, has drawn other enterprises and global players such as AMD, Infineon Technologies (now partly owned by Qimonda), and Toppan Photomasks to site some of their production capability in Dresden. Their factories attract many suppliers of material and cleanroom technology enterprises to Dresden.

The pharmaceutical sector came up at the end of the 19th century. GlaxoSmithKline Biologicals Dresden (former Sächsisches Serumwerk Dresden), is a world leader in vaccine production. Another traditional pharmacy producer is the Arzneimittelwerke Dresden (Pharmaceutical Works, Dresden).

A third (traditional) branch is that of mechanical and electrical engineering. Volkswagen is currently manufacturing its Phaeton car model and the Bentley "flying spur" model at the Transparent Factory. A subsidiary of EADS, the Elbe Flugzeugwerke (Elbe Aircraft Works) is the leading company for rebuilding Airbus passenger aircraft to become freight aircraft.

Formed from the merger of Dresdner Volksbank Raiffeisenbank eG and Volksbank Bautzen eG in August 2017, the Volksbank Dresden-Bautzen is the largest cooperative bank in Saxony and the largest in the east outside of Berlin in 2018.

Media
The most important newspaper published in Dresden is the Sächsische Zeitung which has a circulation of around 300,000. The second main newspaper, Dresdner Neueste Nachrichten, is a newspaper with a circulation of about 50,000. The Sächsische Zeitung was established in 1946 and became the press media of the socialist party SED in the district of Dresden until 1990. It is now a much more independent newspaper with a small influence by the social-democratic party.

The Dresdner Neueste Nachrichten has even older origins. It first came out in 1893 and ran until 1943 when its offices were closed down by the Nazis. During GDR times, the same offices produced the newspapers Die Union (the regional press organ of the Christian Democratic Union), the Sächsisches Tageblatt (the regional press organ of the Liberal Democratic Party of Germany) and the Sächsische Neueste Nachrichten (the press organ of the National Democratic Party of Germany). All these newspapers were controlled by Socialist censorship between 1949 and 1990. Die Union was the first newspaper in the GDR that reported about the Monday demonstrations in GDR realistically and freely. In 1990 the newspapers joined back together again and took back on the name Dresdner Neueste Nachrichten; the newspaper celebrated its 110-year anniversary in 2003.

Dresden is the home of the Saxon Broadcasting Center which is a subunit of the Mitteldeutscher Rundfunk and hosts the regional studios. Dresden Fernsehen is a television channel broadcast in Dresden while there are a number of private radio stations broadcasting throughout Saxony.

Another sobriquet of Dresden is connected with the media: Because citizens of Dresden were not able to receive (uncensored) television programmes broadcast in the former western states during Socialist times, Dresden gained the name "Tal der Ahnungslosen" which means "Valley of the Clueless". The television channel ARD was known as "Außer Raum Dresden" ("except the Dresden area").

See also
Economic history of Germany

References

 
Dresden
Dresden